Tyler Dees is an American politician representing part of Northwest Arkansas in the Arkansas Senate since 2023.

Life and career 
Dees attended John Brown University. He is a businessperson working in retail for Simmons Foods.

Longtime member of the Arkansas General Assembly Jim Hendren (Independent) announced his retirement in 2022, opening a vacancy in the 35th district, which had recently been renumbered from the 2nd district during redistricting. Dees ran against Jeff Tennant and State Representative Gayla Hendren McKenzie in the March 2022 Republican primary. The race went to a runoff election, when Dees defeated McKenzie to win the Republican nomination.

In November 2022, Dees defeated Libertarian Doug Peterson in the general election, winning 73 percent of the votes. He was seated on January 9, 2023 in the 94th Arkansas General Assembly.

References 

Living people
Year of birth missing (living people)
Place of birth missing (living people)
Republican Party Arkansas state senators
21st-century American politicians
John Brown University alumni